GanjiRamayyapetha is a hamlet in the Sironcha Tehsil of Gadchiroli district of Maharashtra, India.

Geography 
Ganjiramayyapetha is located at  18°50′N 79°58′E18.83°N 79.96°E. It has an average elevation of 118 metres (390 feet).

Education 
There exists a primary school that caters to the educational needs of the residents of the village.

Transport 
Ganjiramayyapetha is connected by the State Road Transport services to Sironcha, Ankisa, Gadchiroli, Aheri, Chandrapur, Nagpur and Wardha via Sironcha. Ganjiramayyapetha is also connected to Telangana state capital Hyderabad and some popular city like Warngal, Karimnagar, Manchiriyal via Sironcha.

References 

Villages in Gadchiroli district